The concentrated snail also known as the Santa Barbara Island snail, scientific name Micrarionta facta, is a species of air-breathing land snail,  a terrestrial pulmonate gastropod mollusk in the family Helminthoglyptidae.

This species is endemic to the United States.

Sources

Endemic fauna of the United States
Molluscs of the United States
Micrarionta
Gastropods described in 1864
Taxonomy articles created by Polbot